Gilgit-Baltistan, formerly known as the Northern Areas, is a region administered by Pakistan as an administrative territory  and constituting the northern portion of the larger Kashmir region which has been the subject of a dispute between India and Pakistan since 1947, and between India and China from somewhat later.  It borders Azad Kashmir to the south, the province of Khyber Pakhtunkhwa to the west, the Wakhan Corridor of Afghanistan to the north, the Xinjiang region of China, to the east and northeast, and the Indian-administered union territories Jammu and Kashmir and Ladakh to the southeast.

The region, together with Azad Kashmir in the southwest, is grouped and referred to by the United Nations and other international organisations as "Pakistan-administered Kashmir".
Gilgit-Baltistan is six times larger than Azad Kashmir in terms of geographical area.

The territory of present-day Gilgit-Baltistan became a separate administrative unit in 1970 under the name "Northern Areas". It was formed by the amalgamation of the former Gilgit Agency, the Baltistan district, and several small former princely states, the largest of which were Hunza and Nagar. In 2009, the region was renamed to "Gilgit-Baltistan" and granted limited autonomy through the Self-Governance Order signed in by former Pakistani president Asif Ali Zardari, a move that was reportedly intended to also empower the territory's people; however, scholars state that the real power rests with the governor and not with the chief minister or elected assembly. Much of the population of Gilgit-Baltistan reportedly wants the territory to become integrated with Pakistan proper as a fifth province, and opposes integration with the rest of the Kashmir region. The Pakistani government had rejected calls from the territory for provincial status on the grounds that granting such a request would jeopardise Pakistan's demands for the entire Kashmir conflict to be resolved according to all related United Nations resolutions. However, in November 2020, Pakistani prime minister Imran Khan announced that Gilgit-Baltistan would attain provisional provincial status after the 2020 Gilgit-Baltistan Assembly election.

Gilgit-Baltistan covers an area of over 72,971 km2 (28,174 sq mi) and is highly mountainous. It had an estimated population of 1.249 million people in 2013 (estimated to be 1.8 million in 2015. Its capital city is Gilgit with an estimated population of 216,760. It's economy is dominated by agriculture and the tourism industry. The region is home to five of the 14 eight-thousanders, including K2, and additionally has more than fifty mountain peaks above 7,000 metres (23,000 ft). Three of the world's longest glaciers outside of Earth's polar regions are found in Gilgit-Baltistan. The main tourism activities are trekking and mountaineering, and this industry has been growing in importance throughout the region.

Early history 

The rock carvings found in various places in Gilgit-Baltistan, especially in the Passu village of Hunza, suggest a human presence since 2000 BC. Within the next few centuries of human settlement on the Tibetan plateau, this region became inhabited by Tibetans, who preceded the Balti people of Baltistan. Today Baltistan bears similarity to Ladakh physically and culturally (although not in religion). Dards are found mainly in the western areas. These people are the Shina-speaking peoples of Gilgit, Chilas, Astore and Diamir, while in Hunza and the upper regions, Burushaski and Khowar speakers predominate. The Dards find mention in the works of Herodotus, Nearchus, Megasthenes, Pliny, Ptolemy, and the geographical lists of the Puranas. In the 1st century, the people of these regions were followers of the Bon religion while in the 2nd century, they practiced Buddhism.

Between 399 and 414, the Chinese Buddhist pilgrim Faxian visited Gilgit-Baltistan. In the 6th century Somana Palola (greater Gilgit-Chilas) was ruled by an unknown king. Between 627 and 645, the Chinese Buddhist pilgrim Xuanzang travelled through this region on his pilgrimage to India.

According to Chinese records from the Tang dynasty, between the 600s and the 700s, the region was governed by a Buddhist dynasty referred to as Bolü, also transliterated as Palola, Patola, Balur. They are believed to have been the Patola Shahis dynasty mentioned in a Brahmi inscription, and devout adherents of Vajrayana Buddhism. At the time, Little Palola was used to refer to Gilgit, while Great Palola was used to refer to Baltistan. However, the records do not consistently disambiguate the two.

In mid-600s, Gilgit came under Chinese suzerainty after the fall of the Western Turkic Khaganate to Tang military campaigns in the region. In the late 600s CE, the rising Tibetan Empire wrestled control of the region from the Chinese. However, faced with growing influence of the Umayyad Caliphate and then the Abbasid Caliphate to the west, the Tibetans were forced to ally themselves with the Islamic caliphates. The region was then contested by Chinese and Tibetan forces, and their respective vassal states, until the mid-700s. Rulers of Gilgit formed an alliance with the Tang Chinese, and held back the Arabs with their help.

Between 644 and 655, Navasurendrāditya-nandin became king of the Palola Sāhi dynasty in Gilgit. Numerous Sanskrit inscriptions, including the Danyor Rock Inscriptions, were discovered to be from his reign. In the late 600s and early 700s, Jayamaṅgalavikramāditya-nandin was king of Gilgit.

According to Chinese court records, in 717 and 719 respectively, delegations of a ruler of Great Palola (Baltistan) named Su-fu-she-li-ji-li-ni reached the Chinese imperial court. By at least 719/720, Ladakh (Mard) became part of the Tibetan Empire. By that time, Buddhism was practised in Baltistan, and Sanskrit was the written language.

In 720, the delegation of Surendrāditya reached the Chinese imperial court. He was referred to in Chinese records as the king of Great Palola; however, it is unknown if Baltistan was under Gilgit rule at the time. The Chinese emperor also granted the ruler of Cashmere, Chandrāpīḍa ("Tchen-fo-lo-pi-li"), the title of "King of Cashmere". By 721/722, Baltistan had come under the influence of the Tibetan Empire.

In 721–722, the Tibetan army attempted but failed to capture Gilgit or Bruzha (Yasin valley). By this time, according to Chinese records, the king of Little Palola was Mo-ching-mang. He had visited the Tang court requesting military assistance against the Tibetans. Between 723 and 728, the Korean Buddhist pilgrim Hyecho passed through this area. In 737/738, Tibetan troops under the leadership of Minister Bel Kyesang Dongtsab of Emperor Me Agtsom took control of Little Palola. By 747, the Chinese army under the leadership of the ethnic-Korean commander Gao Xianzhi had recaptured Little Palola. Great Palola was subsequently captured by the Chinese army in 753 under military Governor Feng Changqing. However, by 755, due to the An Lushan rebellion, the Tang Chinese forces withdrew and were no longer able to exert influence in Central Asia or in the regions around Gilgit-Baltistan. The control of the region was left to the Tibetan Empire. They referred to the region as Bruzha, a toponym that is consistent with the ethnonym "Burusho" used today. Tibetan control of the region lasted until late-800s CE.

Turkic tribes practising Zoroastrianism arrived in Gilgit during the 7th century, and founded the Trakhan dynasty in Gilgit.

Medieval history 
In the 14th century, Sufi Muslim preachers from Persia and Central Asia introduced Islam in Baltistan. Famous amongst them was Mir Sayyid Ali Hamadani, who came through Kashmir while in the Gilgit region Islam entered in the same century through Turkic Tarkhan rulers. Gilgit-Baltistan was ruled by many local rulers, amongst whom the Maqpon dynasty of Skardu and the Rajas of Hunza were famous. The Maqpons of Skardu unified Gilgit-Baltistan with Chitral and Ladakh, especially in the era of Ali Sher Khan Anchan who had friendly relations with the Mughal court. Anchan's reign brought prosperity and entertained art, sport, and variety in architecture. He introduced polo to the Gilgit region, and sent a group of musicians from Chitral to Delhi to learn Indian music; Mughal architecture influenced the architecture of the region as well under his reign. Later Anchan in his successors Abdal Khan had great influence though in the popular literature of Baltistan, where he is still alive as a dark figure by the nickname "Mizos", "man-eater". The last Maqpon Raja, Ahmed Shah, ruled all of Baltistan between 1811 and 1840. The areas of Gilgit, Chitral and Hunza had already become independent of the Maqpons.

Before the demise of Shribadat, a group of Shina people migrated from Gilgit Dardistan and settled in the Dras and Kharmang areas. The descendants of those Dardic people can be still found today, and are believed to have maintained their Dardic culture and Shina language up to the present time.

Modern history

Princely State of Jammu and Kashmir 

In November 1839,  Dogra commander Zorawar Singh, whose allegiance was to Gulab Singh, started his campaign against Baltistan. By 1840 he conquered Skardu and captured its ruler, Ahmad Shah. Ahmad Shah was then forced to accompany Zorawar Singh on his raid into Western Tibet. Meanwhile, Baghwan Singh was appointed as administrator (thanadar) in Skardu. But in the following year, Ali Khan of Rondu, Haidar Khan of Shigar and Daulat Ali Khan from Khaplu led a successful uprising against the Dogras in Baltistan and captured the Dogra commander Baghwan Singh in Skardu.

In 1842, Dogra Commander Wasir Lakhpat, with the active support of Ali Sher Khan (III) from Kartaksho, conquered Baltistan for the second time. There was a violent capture of the fortress of Kharphocho. Haidar Khan from Shigar, one of the leaders of the uprising against the Dogras, was imprisoned and died in captivity. Gosaun was appointed as administrator (Thanadar) of Baltistan and till 1860, the entire region of Gilgit-Baltistan was under the Sikhs and then the Dogras.

After the defeat of the Sikhs in the First Anglo-Sikh War, the region became a part of the Jammu and Kashmir princely state, which since 1846 had remained under the rule of the Dogras. The population in Gilgit perceived itself as ethnically different from Kashmiris and disliked being ruled by the Kashmir state. The region remained with the princely state, with temporary leases of some areas assigned to the British, until 1 November 1947.

First Kashmir War 
After Pakistan's independence, Jammu and Kashmir initially remained an independent state. Later on 22 October 1947, tribal militias backed by Pakistan crossed the border into Jammu and Kashmir after Poonch rebellion and Jammu Muslim massacre. Hari Singh made a plea to India for assistance and signed the Instrument of Accession, making his state a part of India. India air-lifted troops to defend the Kashmir Valley and the invaders were pushed back behind Uri.

Gilgit's population did not favour the State's accession to India. The Muslims of the frontier ilaqas (Gilgit and the adjoining hill states) had wanted to join Pakistan. Sensing their discontent, Major William Brown, the Maharaja's commander of the Gilgit Scouts, mutinied on 1 November 1947, overthrowing the governor Ghansara Singh. The bloodless coup d'état was planned by Brown to the last detail under the code name "Datta Khel", which was also joined by a rebellious section of the Jammu and Kashmir State Forces under Mirza Hassan Khan. Brown ensured that the treasury was secured and minorities were protected. A provisional government (Aburi Hakoomat) was established by the Gilgit locals with Raja Shah Rais Khan as the president and Mirza Hassan Khan as the commander-in-chief. However, Major Brown had already telegraphed Khan Abdul Qayyum Khan asking Pakistan to take over. Pakistan's political agent, Khan Mohammad Alam Khan, arrived on 16 November and took over the administration of Gilgit. Brown outmaneuvered the pro-Independence group and secured the approval of the mirs and rajas for accession to Pakistan. According to Brown,

The provisional government lasted 16 days. According to scholar Yaqub Khan Bangash, it lacked sway over the population. The Gilgit rebellion did not have civilian involvement and was solely the work of military leaders, not all of whom had been in favour of joining Pakistan, at least in the short term. Historian Ahmed Hasan Dani says that although there had been a lack of public participation in the rebellion, pro-Pakistan sentiments were intense in the civilian population and their anti-Kashmiri sentiments were also clear. According to various scholars, the people of Gilgit as well as those of Chilas, Koh Ghizr, Ishkoman, Yasin, Punial, Hunza and Nagar joined Pakistan by choice.

After taking control of Gilgit, the Gilgit Scouts along with Azad irregulars moved towards Baltistan and Ladakh and captured Skardu by May 1948. They successfully blocked Indian reinforcements sent to relieve Skardu, and proceeded towards Kargil and Leh. Indian forces mounted an offensive in the autumn of 1948 to push them back from Ladakh, but Baltistan came into the rebels' territory.

On 1 January 1948, India took the issue of Jammu and Kashmir to the United Nations Security Council. In April 1948, the Council passed a resolution calling for Pakistan to withdraw from all of Jammu and Kashmir and for India to reduce its forces to the minimum level, following which a plebiscite would be held to ascertain the people's wishes. However, no withdrawal was ever carried out. India insisted that Pakistan had to withdraw first and Pakistan contended there was no guarantee that India would withdraw afterwards. Gilgit-Baltistan, along with the western districts that came to be called Azad Kashmir, have remained under the control of Pakistan ever since.

Inside Pakistan 
While the residents of Gilgit-Baltistan expressed a desire to join Pakistan after gaining independence from Maharaja Hari Singh, Pakistan declined to merge the region into itself because of the territory's link to Jammu and Kashmir. For a short period after joining Pakistan, Gilgit-Baltistan was governed by Azad Kashmir if only "theoretically, but not practically" through its claim of being an alternative government for Jammu and Kashmir. In 1949, the Government of Azad Kashmir handed over the administration of Gilgit-Baltistan to the federal government under the Karachi Agreement. According to Indian journalist Paul Sahni, this is seen as an effort by Pakistan to legitimise its rule over Gilgit-Baltistan.

According to Pakistani analyst Ershad Mahmud, there were two reasons why administration was transferred from Azad Kashmir to Pakistan: 
 the region was inaccessible from Azad Kashmir, and
 because both the governments of Azad Kashmir and Pakistan knew that the people of the region were in favour of joining Pakistan in a potential referendum over Kashmir's final status.

According to the International Crisis Group, the Karachi Agreement is highly unpopular in Gilgit-Baltistan because Gilgit-Baltistan was not a party to it even while it was its own fate was being decided.

From then until the 1990s, Gilgit-Baltistan was governed through the colonial-era Frontier Crimes Regulations, which were originally created for the northwest tribal regions. They treated tribal people as "barbaric and uncivilised," levying collective fines and punishments. People had no right to legal representation or appeal. Members of tribes had to obtain prior permission from the police to travel anywhere, and had to keep the police informed about their movements. There was no democratic set-up during this period. All political and judicial powers remained in the hands of the Ministry of Kashmir Affairs and Northern Areas (KANA). The people of Gilgit-Baltistan were deprived of rights enjoyed by citizens of Pakistan and Azad Kashmir.

A primary reason for this state of affairs was the remoteness of Gilgit-Baltistan. Another factor was that the whole of Pakistan itself was deficient in democratic norms and principles, therefore the federal government did not prioritise democratic development in the region. There was also a lack of public pressure as an active civil society was absent in the region, with young educated residents usually opting to live in Pakistan's urban centers instead of staying in the region.

Northern Areas 
In 1970 the two parts of the territory, viz., the Gilgit Agency and Baltistan, were merged into a single administrative unit, and given the name "Northern Areas". The Shaksgam tract was ceded by Pakistan to China following the signing of the Sino-Pakistani Frontier Agreement in 1963. In 1969, a Northern Areas Advisory Council (NAAC) was created, later renamed to Northern Areas Council (NAC) in 1974 and Northern Areas Legislative Council (NALC) in 1994. But it was devoid of legislative powers. All law-making was concentrated in the KANA Ministry of Pakistan. In 1994, a Legal Framework Order (LFO) was created by the KANA Ministry to serve as the de facto constitution for the region.

In 1974, the former State Subject law was abolished in Gilgit Baltistan, and Pakistanis from other areas could buy land and settle.

In 1984 the territory's importance shot up within Pakistan with the opening of the Karakoram Highway and the region's population became more connected to mainland Pakistan. The improved connectivity facilitated the local population to avail itself of educational opportunities in the rest of Pakistan. Italso allowed the political parties of Pakistan and Azad Kashmir to set up local branches, raise political awareness in the region. According to Ershad Mahmud, these Pakistani political parties have played a 'laudable role' in organising a movement for democratic rights among the residents of Gilgit-Baltistan.

In the 1988 Gilgit Massacre, groups of Islamist Sunnis, supported by Osama bin Laden, Pervez Musharraf, General Zia-ul Haq and Mirza Aslam Beg slaughtered hundreds of local Shias.

Present structure 
In the late 1990s, the President of Al-Jihad Trust filed a petition in the Supreme Court of Pakistan to determine the legal status of Gilgit-Baltistan. In its judgement of 28 May 1999, the Court directed the Government of Pakistan to ensure the provision of equal rights to the people of Gilgit-Baltistan, and gave it six months to do so. Following the Supreme Court decision, the government took several steps to devolve power to the local level. However, in several policy circles, the point was raised that the Pakistani government was helpless to comply with the court verdict because of the strong political and sectarian divisions in Gilgit-Baltistan and also because of the territory's historical connection with the still disputed Kashmir region, and that this prevented the determination of Gilgit-Baltistan's real status.

A position of 'Deputy Chief Executive' was created to act as the local administrator, but the real powers still rested with the 'Chief Executive', who was the Federal Minister of KANA. "The secretaries were more powerful than the concerned advisors," in the words of one commentator. In spite of various reforms packages over the years, the situation is essentially unchanged. Meanwhile, public rage in Gilgit-Baltistan "[grew] alarmingly." Prominent "antagonist groups" have mushroomed protesting the absence of civic rights and democracy. The Pakistani government has debated granting provincial status to Gilgit-Baltistan.
Gilgit-Baltistan has been a member state of the Unrepresented Nations and Peoples Organization since 2008.
According to Antia Mato Bouzas, the PPP-led Pakistani government has attempted a compromise through its 2009 reforms between its traditional stand on the Kashmir dispute and the demands of locals, most of whom may have pro-Pakistan sentiments. While the 2009 reforms have added to the self-identification of the region, they have not resolved the constitutional status of the region within Pakistan.

According to 2010 news reports, the people of Gilgit-Baltistan want to merge into Pakistan as a separate fifth province. However, as of 2015 leaders of Azad Kashmir were opposed to any step towards integrating Gilgit-Baltistan into Pakistan. The people of Gilgit-Baltistan have opposed integration with Azad Kashmir. They desire Pakistani citizenship and a constitutional status for their region.

In 2016, for the first time in the country's Constitution, Gilgit-Baltistan had been mentioned by name.

In September 2020, it was reported that Pakistan decided to elevate Gilgit-Baltistan's status to that of a full-fledged province.

Government 

The territory of present-day Gilgit-Baltistan became a separate administrative unit in 1970 under the name "Northern Areas". It was formed by the amalgamation of the former Gilgit Agency, the Baltistan District of the Ladakh Wazarat and the hill states of Hunza and Nagar. In 1993, an attempt was made by the High Court of Azad Jammu and Kashmir to annex Gilgit-Baltistan but was quashed by the Supreme Court of Pakistan after protests by the locals of Gilgit-Baltistan, who feared domination by the Kashmiris.

Government of Pakistan abolished State Subject Rule in Gilgit-Baltistan in 1974, which resulted in demographic changes in the territory. While administratively controlled by Pakistan since the First Kashmir War, Gilgit-Baltistan has never been formally integrated into the Pakistani state and does not participate in Pakistan's constitutional political affairs. On 29 August 2009, the Gilgit-Baltistan Empowerment and Self-Governance Order 2009, was passed by the Pakistani cabinet and later signed by the then President of Pakistan Asif Ali Zardari. The order granted self-rule to the people of Gilgit-Baltistan, by creating, among other things, an elected Gilgit-Baltistan Legislative Assembly and Gilgit-Baltistan Council. Gilgit-Baltistan thus gained a de facto province-like status without constitutionally becoming part of Pakistan. Currently, Gilgit-Baltistan is neither a province nor a state. It has a semi-provincial status. Officially, the Pakistan government had rejected Gilgit-Baltistani calls for integration with Pakistan on the grounds that it would jeopardise its demands for the whole Kashmir issue to be resolved according to UN resolutions. Some Kashmiri nationalist groups, such as the Jammu and Kashmir Liberation Front, claim Gilgit-Baltistan as part of a future independent state to match what existed in 1947. India, on the other hand, maintains that Gilgit-Baltistan is a part of the former princely state of Jammu and Kashmir that is "an integral part of the country [India]."

The Gilgit-Baltistan Police (GBP) is responsible for law enforcement in Gilgit-Baltistan. The mission of the force is the prevention and detection of crime, maintenance of law and order and enforcement of the Constitution of Pakistan.

Regions 

Gilgit-Baltistan is administratively divided into three divisions: Baltistan, Diamer and Gilgit, which, in turn, are divided into fourteen districts.

The principal administrative centers are the towns of Gilgit and Skardu.

* Combined population of Skardu, Shigar, Kharmang and Roundu districts. Shigar and Kharmang Districts were carved out of Skardu District after 1998. The estimated population of Gilgit-Baltistan was about 1.8 million in 2015 and the overall population growth rate between 1998 and 2011 was 63.1% making it 4.85% annually.

Security
Security in Gilgit-Baltistan is provided by the Gilgit-Baltistan Police, the Gilgit Baltistan Scouts (a paramilitary force), and the Northern Light Infantry (part of the Pakistani Army).

Geography and climate 

Gilgit-Baltistan borders Pakistan's Khyber Pukhtunkhwa province to the west, a small portion of the Wakhan Corridor of Afghanistan to the north, China's Xinjiang Uyghur Autonomous Region to the northeast, the Indian-administered Jammu and Kashmir to the southeast, and the Pakistani-administered state of Azad Jammu and Kashmir to the south.

Gilgit-Baltistan is home to all five of Pakistan's "eight-thousanders" and to more than fifty peaks above . Gilgit and Skardu are the two main hubs for expeditions to those mountains. The region is home to some of the world's highest mountain ranges. The main ranges are the Karakoram and the western Himalayas. The Pamir Mountains are to the north, and the Hindu Kush lies to the west. Amongst the highest mountains are K2 (Mount Godwin-Austen) and Nanga Parbat, the latter being one of the most feared mountains in the world.

Three of the world's longest glaciers outside the polar regions are found in Gilgit-Baltistan: the Biafo Glacier, the Baltoro Glacier, and the Batura Glacier. There are, in addition, several high-altitude lakes in Gilgit-Baltistan:

 Sheosar Lake in the Deosai Plains, Skardu
 Naltar lakes in the Naltar Valley, Gilgit
 Satpara Tso Lake in Skardu, Baltistan
 Katzura Tso Lake in Skardu, Baltistan
 Zharba Tso Lake in Shigar, Baltistan
 Phoroq Tso Lake in Skardu, Baltistan
 Lake Kharfak in Gangche, Baltistan
 Byarsa Tso Lake in Gultari, Astore
 Borith Lake in Gojal, upper Hunza, Gilgit
 Rama Lake near Astore
 Rush Lake near Nagar, Gilgit
 Kromber Lake at Kromber Pass, Ishkoman Valley, Ghizer District
 Barodaroksh Lake in Bar Valley, Nagar
 Ghorashi Lake in Ghandus Valley, Kharmang

The plateau lies east of Astore, south of Skardu and west of Ladakh. The area was declared as a national park in 1993. The Deosai Plains cover an area of almost . For over half the year (between September and May), Deosai is snow-bound and cut off from rest of Astore and Baltistan in winters. The village of Deosai lies close to Chilum chokki and is connected with the Kargil district of Ladakh through an all-weather road.

Rock art and petroglyphs 
There are more than 50,000 pieces of rock art (petroglyphs) and inscriptions all along the Karakoram Highway in Gilgit-Baltistan, concentrated at ten major sites between Hunza and Shatial. The carvings were left by invaders, traders, and pilgrims who passed along the trade route, as well as by locals. The earliest date back to between 5000 and 1000 BCE, showing single animals, triangular men and hunting scenes in which the animals are larger than the hunters. These carvings were pecked into the rock with stone tools and are covered with a thick patina that proves their age.

The ethnologist  has pieced together the history of the area from inscriptions and recorded his findings in Rock Carvings and Inscriptions in the Northern Areas of Pakistan and the later-released Between Gandhara and the Silk Roads — Rock Carvings Along the Karakoram Highway. Many of these carvings and inscriptions will be inundated and/or destroyed when the planned Basha-Diamir dam is built and the Karakoram Highway is widened.

Climate 

The climate of Gilgit-Baltistan varies from region to region, since the surrounding mountain ranges create sharp variations in weather. The eastern part has the moist zone of the western Himalayas, but going toward Karakoram and Hindu Kush, the climate gets considerably drier.

There are towns like Gilgit and Chilas that are very hot during the day in summer yet cold at night and valleys like Astore, Khaplu, Yasin, Hunza, and Nagar, where the temperatures are cold even in summer.

Climate Change Effects

Climate change has adversely effected this region with more rains every year. On 26 August 2022, most villages in Ghizer district and Hunza were severely effected by the ongoing flooding displacing many people.

Economy and resources 

The economy of the region is primarily based on a traditional trade route, the historic Silk Road. The China Trade Organization forum led the people of the area to actively invest and learn modern trade know-how from their Chinese neighbour, Xinjiang. Later, the establishment of a chamber of commerce and the Sust dry port in Gojal Hunza are milestones. The rest of the economy is shouldered by mainly agriculture and tourism. Agricultural products are wheat, corn (maize), barley, and fruits. Tourism is mostly in trekking and mountaineering, and this industry is growing in importance.

In early September 2009, Pakistan signed an agreement with the People's Republic of China for a major energy project in Gilgit-Baltistan which includes the construction of a 7,000-megawatt dam at Bunji in the Astore District.

Mountaineering 

Other well known peaks include Masherbrum (also known as K1), Broad Peak, Hidden Peak, Gasherbrum II, Gasherbrum IV, and Chogolisa, situated in Khaplu Valley. The following peaks have so far been scaled by various expeditions:

Basic facilities

Gilgit has not received a gas pipeline infrastructure since Pakistan's independence, unlike other cities. Through the importation of gas cylinders from other provinces, many private gas contractors offer gas cylinders. The LPG (Liquefied Petroleum Gas) Air Mix Plant project by Sui Northern Gas Pipelines Limited was unveiled in 2020 with the goal of bringing the gas facility to Gilgit. This will significantly reduce deforestation as public uses wood from trees for heating and lighting purpose. The first head office has been built in Gilgit City.

Tourism 

Gilgit Baltistan is the capital of tourism in Pakistan. Gilgit Baltistan is home to some of the highest peaks in the world, including K2 the second highest peak in the world. Gilgit Baltistan's landscape includes mountains, lakes, glaciers and valleys. Gilgit Baltistan is not only known for its mountains — it is also visited for its landmarks, culture, history and people. K2 Basecamp, Deosai, Naltar, Fairy Meadows Bagrot Valley and Hushe valley are common places to visit in Gilgit Baltistan.

Transport 

Before 1978, Gilgit-Baltistan was cut off from the rest of the Pakistan and the world due to the harsh terrain and the lack of accessible roads. All of the roads to the south opened toward the Pakistan-administered state of Azad Kashmir and to the southeast toward the present-day Indian-administered Jammu and Kashmir. During the summer, people could walk across the mountain passes to travel to Rawalpindi. The fastest way to travel was by air, but air travel was accessible only to a few privileged local people and to Pakistani military and civilian officials. Then, with the assistance of the Chinese government, Pakistan began construction of the Karakoram Highway (KKH), which was completed in 1978. The journey from Rawalpindi / Islamabad to Gilgit takes approximately 20 to 24 hours.

The Karakoram Highway connects Islamabad to Gilgit and Skardu, which are the two major hubs for mountaineering expeditions in Gilgit-Baltistan. Northern Areas Transport Corporation (NATCO) offers bus and jeep transport service to the two hubs and several other popular destinations, lakes, and glaciers in the area. Landslides on the Karakoram Highway are very common.

There would also be one daily bus in each direction between the Sust and Taxkorgan border areas of the two political entities.

Pakistan International Airlines used to fly a Fokker F27 Friendship daily between Gilgit Airport and Benazir Bhutto International Airport. The flying time was approximately 50 minutes, and the flight was one of the most scenic in the world, as its route passed over Nanga Parbat, a mountain whose peak is higher than the aircraft's cruising altitude. However, the Fokker F27 was retired after a crash at Multan in 2006. Currently, flights are being operated by PIA to Gilgit on the brand-new ATR 42–500, which was purchased in 2006. With the new plane, the cancellation of flights is much less frequent. Pakistan International Airlines also offers regular flights of a Boeing 737 between Skardu and Islamabad. All flights are subject to weather clearance; in winter, flights are often delayed by several days.

A railway through the region has been proposed; see Khunjerab Railway for details.

Demographics

Population 
The population of Gilgit Baltistan is 1,492,924 as of 2017. The estimated population of Gilgit-Baltistan in 2013 was 1.249 million, and it was 873,000 in 1998. Approximately 14% of the population was urban. The fertility rate is 4.7 children per woman, which is the highest in Pakistan.

The population of Gilgit-Baltistan consists of many diverse linguistic, ethnic, and religious sects, due in part to the many isolated valleys separated by some of the world's highest mountains. The ethnic groups include Shins, Yashkuns, Kashmiris, Kashgaris, Pamiris, Pathans, and Kohistanis. A significant number of people from Gilgit-Baltistan are residing in other parts of Pakistan, mainly in Punjab and Karachi. The literacy rate of Gilgit-Baltistan is approximately 72%.

In 2017 census, Gilgit District has the highest population of 330,000 and Hunza District the lowest of 50,000.

Languages 
Gilgit-Baltistan is a multilingual region where Urdu being a national and official language serves as the lingua franca for inter ethnic communications. English is co-official and also used in education, while Arabic is used for religious purposes. The table below shows a break-up of Gilgit-Baltistan first-language speakers.

Religion 

The population of Gilgit-Baltistan is entirely Muslim and is denominationally the most diverse in the country. The region is also the only Shia-plurality area in an otherwise Sunni-dominant Pakistan. People in the Skardu district are mostly Shia, while Diamir and Astore districts have Sunni majorities. Ghanche has a Noorbakhshi population, and Ghizar has an Ismaili majority. The populations in Gilgit, Hunza and Nagar districts are composed of a mix of all of these sects. According to Indian government official, B. Raman, the Shias and Ismailis constituted about 85% of the population in 1948. Raman claims the proportion was brought down by General Zia ul-Haq through a conscious policy of demographic change by encouraging the migration of Sunnis from other provinces and the Federally Administered Tribal Areas, in an effort to counter the growing sectarian consciousness of the Shias after the Iranian Revolution in 1979. Recent surveys show that Shia Ismaili women, both rural and urban, have high rates of contraceptives usage and low fertility rates; by contrast Sunni women, especially in rural areas, have low rates of contraceptive usage and high fertility rates.

Culture 

Gilgit-Baltistan is home to diversified cultures, ethnic groups, languages and backgrounds. Major cultural events include the Shandoor Polo Festival, Babusar Polo Festival and Jashn-e-Baharan or the Harvest Time Festival (Navroz). Traditional dances include: Old Man Dance in which more than one person wears old-style dresses; Cow Boy Dance (Payaloo) in which a person wears old style dress, long leather shoes and holds a stick in hand and the Sword Dance in which the participants show taking one sword in right and shield in left. One to six participants can dance in pairs.

Sports 

Many types of sports are in currency, throughout the region, but most popular of them is Polo. Almost every bigger valley has a polo ground, polo matches in such grounds attract locals as well as foreigners visitors during summer season. One of such polo tournament is held in Shandur each year and polo teams of Gilgit with Chitral participates. Though very internationally unlikely, but even for some local historians like Hassan Hasrat from Skardu and for some national writers like Ahmed Hasan Dani it was originated in same region. For testimonies, they present the Epic of King Gesar of balti version where king gesar started polo by killing his step son and hit head of cadaver with a stick thus started the game they also held that the very simple rules of local polo game also testifies its primitiveness. The English word Polo has Balti origin, that is spoken in same region, dates back to the 19th century which means ball.

Other popular sports are football, cricket, volleyball (mostly play in winters) and other minor local sports. with growing facilities and particular local geography Climbing, trekking and other similar sports are also getting popularity. Samina Baig from Hunza valley is the only Pakistani woman and the third Pakistani to climb Mount Everest and also the youngest Muslim woman to climb Everest, having done so at the age of 21 while Hassan Sadpara from Skardu valley is the first Pakistani to have climbed six eight-thousanders including the world's highest peak Everest (8848 m) besides K2 (8611 m), Gasherbrum I (8080 m), Gasherbrum II (8034 m), Nanga Parbat (8126 m), Broad Peak (8051 m).

Notable people
 Amen Aamir, first woman from Gilgit-Baltistan to qualify as a pilot

See also 

 Northern Pakistan
 Balti language
 Balti people
 List of cities in Gilgit Baltistan
 List of cultural heritage sites in Gilgit-Baltistan
 List of mountains in Pakistan

Notes

References

Bibliography 

 
 
 
 
 
 
 
 
 
 
 
 
 
 
  First published as 
 
 
 </ref>

External links 

 Official Website of the Gilgit-Baltistan Council
 Official Website of the Government of Gilgit-Baltistan
 Official Tourism Website of the Government of Gilgit-Baltistan
 Official Website of Ministry of Kashmir & Gilgit-Baltistan
 
 

 
Subdivisions of Pakistan
Disputed territories in Asia
Foreign relations of Pakistan
States and territories established in 1970
Territorial disputes of India